Illiger's saddle-back tamarin (Leontocebus illigeri) is a species of saddle-back tamarin, a type of small monkey from South America.  Illiger's saddle-back tamarin was formerly considered to be a subspecies of the brown-mantled tamarin, L. fuscicollis.  It is closely related to the Andean saddle-back tamarin.  It is endemic to the Peruvian Amazon and its type locality is in Loreto, Peru, at the left bank of the lower Rio Ucayali.

The IUCN rates it as near threatened from a conservation standpoint.

References

Leontocebus
Taxa named by Jacques Pucheran
Mammals described in 1845